Sarah Boyle may refer to:

 Sarah Boyle (1609–1633), daughter of Richard Boyle, 1st Earl of Cork
 Sarah Patton Boyle (1906–1994), American author and civil rights activist